Evgenii Tiurnev was the defending champion but chose not to defend his title.

Fábián Marozsán won the title after defeating Sebastian Ofner 7–5, 6–0 in the final.

Seeds

Draw

Finals

Top half

Bottom half

References

External links
Main draw
Qualifying draw

Antalya Challenger - 1